Jaura (also spelt Joura or Jora) is a town and a nagar panchayat in Morena district in the Indian state of Madhya Pradesh.

Jaura is part of Morena Lok Sabha constituency along with seven other Vidhan Sabha segments, namely, Sabalgarh, Sumawali, Morena, Dimani and Ambah in this district and Sheopur and Vjaypur in Sheopur district.

Jaura is also a railway station on the Gwalior Light Railway, a narrow-gauge line from Gwalior to Sheopur.

Demographics

As of the 2011 Census of India, Joura had a population of 398,111. Males constitute 54% of the population and females 46%. Joura has an average literacy rate of 55.8% (as per 2001 census, it was 64%), less than the national average of 74%: male literacy is 66%, and female literacy is 42.6%. In Joura, 16% of the population is under 6 years of age.

Among the villages that pertain to the tehsil of Jaura is gram panchayat Chachiha.

Gallery

References

Cities and towns in Morena district
Morena